Goregrind is a fusion genre of grindcore and death metal. British band Carcass are commonly credited for the emergence of the genre. Goregrind is recognized for its heavily edited, pitch shifted gurgled vocals and abrasive musicianship rooted in grindcore.

History
Despite the early impact of albums such as Repulsion's Horrified and Impetigo's Ultimo Mondo Cannibale, the origins of the genre really lie with the British band Carcass, who began their career in the late 1980s. In their Reek of Putrefaction era, Carcass used pitch shifters, medical imagery and several visceral associations when it originally conceived the band, a deviation from the frequently political or left-wing lyrics commonly used in the hardcore punk and grindcore scenes.

Characteristics
According to Matthew Harvey,

Zero Tolerance described goregrind as being defined by "detuned guitars, blasting drums (sometimes with a high-tuned, clanging 'biscuit tin' snare drum sound), sickening lyrics and often heavily processed/distorted vocals." Goregrind bands commonly use extremely low or pitch-shifted vocals. The lyrics' subject matter often features violent themes including gore, forensic pathology, death, and rape. Lyrics sometimes have a clear tongue-in-cheek Z-grade horror-movie feel and are not expected to be taken seriously. Cyjan, former drummer for Polish goregrind band Dead Infection, commented, "Musically, there's no real difference between grindcore and goregrind, but lyrically, whereas the first is socially and politically concerned, goregrind, as the name implies, deals with everything related to blood, pathological aspects or accidents with fatal results."

Offshoot genres

Pornogrind

Pornogrind (also known as porngrind or pornogore) is a microgenre, which is similar and related to goregrind, that deals with sexual and pornographic themes, hence the name. Notable bands include Gut and Cock and Ball Torture.

See also
 List of goregrind bands
 Deathgrind
 Death metal

References

Grindcore
Death metal
Hardcore punk genres
Heavy metal genres
Extreme metal
English styles of music
British rock music genres